Daukšiai is a town in Marijampolė municipality, Lithuania. According to the 2011 census, the town has a population of 275 people.

References 

Towns in Lithuania
Towns in Marijampolė County